Jettingen is a town in the district of Böblingen in Baden-Württemberg in Germany.

People 
 Isabella Braun (1815-1886), German writer

References

Böblingen (district)